Ji Dandi (born June 30, 1982), formerly known as Ji Minjia, is a Chinese singer from the city of Chengdu, Sichuan.

In the TV show Super Girl, season 2004, Ji finished fourth in the Chengdu qualification round. In the following 2005 season, she finished first in the Hangzhou qualification round and fifth overall in the national results. Since then, Ji has attained international recognition. She produced the title song for the Japanese anime series Galaxy Railways. On December 29, 2015, she changed her name from Ji Minjia to Ji Dandi.

References

External links
Official blog
Official website (Japanese)

1982 births
Living people
Super Girl contestants
Singers from Chengdu